The Behler See is a lake in the Holstein Switzerland region of North Germany. It lies between Timmdorf (municipality of Malente) to the east and the town of Plön to the west. To the east it transitions into the Langensee, to the west into the Höftsee.

All these lakes are crossed from east to west by the River Schwentine.
The Behler See is named after the village of Behl in the municipality of Grebin, which lies to the north.

See also
List of lakes in Schleswig-Holstein

Lakes of Schleswig-Holstein
LBehler See